Eric Larsen may refer to:
Eric Larsen (explorer), polar adventurer
Erik Larsen (born 1962), American comic book creator

See also
Erik Larson (disambiguation)